Brock Cole (born May 29, 1938) is an American children's author and illustrator. He is an author and illustrator of pictures books for children as well as a writer of novels and novellas for young adult readers. The subject matter of his juvenile fiction is perhaps more controversial than that of his peers, landing him on the ALA 100 Most Frequently Challenged Books 1990-2000.  Though some of his books have been challenged for content, he has become well known for his style and form.

Born in Charlotte, Michigan Cole spent most of his childhood moving around the Midwest with his family, as his father was a dentist in the army during World War II. Cole attended Kenyon College where he earned a bachelor's degree in English in 1960 and then the University of Minnesota where he earned a PhD in Philosophy in 1972. Before becoming an author Cole was a philosophy professor at the University of Wisconsin in Madison.

Cole is married to the Classicist Susan Guettel Cole, who taught at the University of Illinois at Chicago from 1975-1992 and the University at Buffalo from 1992-2008. The Coles reside in Buffalo, New York and have two children and two grandchildren.

Bibliography

While he has written many children's books, among them Buttons, he is best known for his novels and novellas for young adults.

Children's books
The King at the Door (1979)
No More Baths (1980)
Nothing but a Pig (1981)
The Winter Wren (1984)
The Giant's Toe (1986)
Alpha and the Dirty Baby (1991)
Buttons (2000)
Larky Mavis (2001)
Fair Monaco (2003)

Young adult books
The Goats (1987)
Celine (1989)
The Facts Speak for Themselves (1997)
Sündenböcke (1988)

Illustrations
 The Indian in the Cupboard
 Gaffer Sampson's Luck
 George Washington's Teeth
 Gully's Travels

Cole is said to be "a writer who knows and respects the audience for whom he is writing."

Excerpts

(From Buttons)
"I shall dress in my finest clothes and walk up and down the Palace Bridge. Surely a rich man will fall in love with me and ask me to be his wife. But I will say, 'No! I can never be yours! Not unless you first give me all your buttons!'"
"Many buttons were lost or destroyed in the process, but who could think of buttons at a time like this?"

References

 

1938 births
American children's book illustrators
American children's writers
Kenyon College alumni
University of Minnesota College of Liberal Arts alumni
Living people